Fletcher Christian (25 September 1764 – 20 September 1793) was master's mate on board HMS Bounty during Lieutenant William Bligh's voyage to Tahiti during 1787–1789 for breadfruit plants. In the mutiny on the Bounty, Christian seized command of the ship from Bligh on 28 April 1789. Some of the mutineers were left on Tahiti, while Christian, eight other mutineers, six Tahitian men and eleven Tahitian women settled on isolated Pitcairn Island, and Bounty was burned. After the settlement was discovered in 1808, the sole surviving mutineer gave conflicting accounts of how Christian died.

Early life
Christian was born on 25 September 1764, at his family home of Moorland Close, Eaglesfield, near Cockermouth in Cumberland, England. Fletcher's father's side had originated from the Isle of Man and most of his paternal great-grandfathers were historic Deemsters, their original family surname McCrystyn.

Fletcher was the brother to Edward and Humphrey, being the three sons of Charles Christian of Moorland Close and of the large Ewanrigg Hall estate in Dearham, Cumberland, an attorney-at-law descended from Manx gentry, and his wife Ann Dixon.

Charles's marriage to Ann brought with it the small property of Moorland Close, "a quadrangle pile of buildings ... half castle, half farmstead." The property can be seen to the north of the Cockermouth to Egremont A5086 road. Charles died in 1768 when Fletcher was not yet four. Ann proved herself grossly irresponsible with money. By 1779, when Fletcher was fifteen, Ann had run up a debt of nearly £6,500 (equal to £ today), and faced the prospect of debtors' prison. Moorland Close was lost and Ann and her three younger children were forced to flee to the Isle of Man, to their relative's estate, where English creditors had no power.

The three elder Christian sons managed to arrange a £40 (equal to £ today) per year annuity for their mother, allowing the family to live in genteel poverty. Christian spent seven years at the Cockermouth Free School from the age of nine. One of his younger contemporaries there was Cockermouth native William Wordsworth. It is commonly suggested that the two were "school friends"; in fact, Christian was six years older than Wordsworth. His mother Ann died on the Isle of Man in 1819.

Naval career
See here for a comparison of assignments to William Bligh

Fletcher Christian began his naval career at a late age, joining the Royal Navy as a cabin boy when he was already seventeen years old (the average age for this position was between 12 to 15). He served for over a year on a third-rate ship-of-the-line along with his future commander, William Bligh, who was posted as the ship's sixth lieutenant. Christian next became a midshipman on the sixth-rate post ship HMS Eurydice and was made Master's Mate six months after the ship put to sea.  The muster rolls of  indicate Christian was signed on for a 21-month voyage to India. The ship's muster shows Christian's conduct was more than satisfactory because "some seven months out from England, he had been promoted from midshipman to master's mate".

After Eurydice had returned from India, Christian was reverted to midshipman and paid off from the Royal Navy. Unable to find another midshipman assignment, Christian decided to join the British merchant fleet and applied for a berth on board William Bligh's ship Britannia. Bligh had himself been discharged from the Royal Navy and was now a merchant captain. Bligh accepted Christian on the ship's books as an able seaman, but granted him all the rights of a ship's officer including dining and berthing in the officer quarters. On a second voyage to Jamaica with Bligh, Christian was rated as the ship's Second Mate.

In 1787 Bligh approached Christian to serve on board HMAV Bounty for a two-year voyage to transport breadfruit from Tahiti to the West Indies. Bligh originally had every intention of Christian serving as the ship's Master, but the Navy Board turned down this request due to Christian's low seniority in service years and appointed John Fryer instead. Christian was retained as Master's Mate. The following year, halfway through the Bounty's voyage, Bligh appointed Christian as acting lieutenant, thus making him senior to Fryer.

On 28 April 1789, Fletcher Christian led a mutiny on board the Bounty and from this point forward was considered an outlaw. He was formally stripped of his naval rank in March 1790 and discharged after Bligh returned to England and reported the mutiny to the Admiralty Board.

Mutiny on the Bounty

In 1787, Christian was appointed master's mate on Bounty, on Bligh's recommendation, for the ship's breadfruit expedition to Tahiti. During the voyage out, Bligh appointed him acting lieutenant. Bounty arrived at Tahiti on 26 October 1788 and Christian spent the next five months there.

Bounty set sail with its cargo of breadfruit plantings on 4 April 1789. Some 1,300 miles west of Tahiti, near Tonga, mutiny broke out on 28 April 1789, led by Christian. According to accounts, the sailors were attracted to the "idyllic" life and sexual opportunities afforded on the Pacific island of Tahiti. Following the court-martial of captured mutineers, Edward Christian argued that they were motivated by Bligh's allegedly harsh treatment of them. Eighteen mutineers set Bligh afloat in a small boat with eighteen of the twenty-two crew loyal to him.

Following the mutiny, Christian first travelled to Tahiti, where he married Maimiti, the daughter of one of the local chiefs. He then attempted to build a colony on Tubuai, but there the mutineers came into conflict with natives. Abandoning the island, he stopped briefly in Tahiti again, and dropped off sixteen crewmen. These sixteen included four Bligh loyalists who had been left behind on Bounty and two who had neither participated in, nor resisted, the mutiny. The remaining nine mutineers, six Tahitian men and eleven Tahitian women, then sailed eastward. In time, they landed on Pitcairn Island, where they stripped Bounty of all that could be floated ashore before Matthew Quintal set it on fire, stranding them. The resulting sexual imbalance, combined with the effective enslavement of the Tahitian men by the mutineers, led to insurrection and the deaths of most of the men.

Death
The American seal-hunting ship Topaz visited Pitcairn in 1808 and found only one mutineer, John Adams (who had used the alias Alexander Smith while on Bounty), still alive along with nine Tahitian women. The mutineers who had perished had, however, already had children with their Tahitian wives. Most of these children were still living. Adams and Maimiti claimed Christian had been murdered during the conflict between the Tahitian men and the mutineers. According to an account by a Pitcairn woman named Jenny who left the island in 1817, Christian was shot while working by a pond next to the home of his pregnant wife. Along with Christian, four other mutineers and all six of the Tahitian men who had come to the island were killed in the conflict. William McCoy, one of the four surviving mutineers, fell off a cliff while intoxicated and was killed. Quintal was later killed by the remaining two mutineers, Adams and Ned Young, after he attacked them. Young became the new leader of Pitcairn.

John Adams gave conflicting accounts of Christian's death to visitors on ships that subsequently visited Pitcairn. He was variously said to have died of natural causes, committed suicide, become insane or been murdered.

Christian was survived by Maimiti and his son, Thursday October Christian (born 1790). Besides Thursday October, Fletcher Christian also had a younger son named Charles Christian (born 1792) and a daughter Mary Ann Christian (born 1793). Thursday and Charles are the ancestors of almost everybody with the surname Christian on Pitcairn and Norfolk Islands, as well as the many descendants who have moved to Australia, New Zealand and the United States.

Rumours have persisted for more than two hundred years that Christian's murder was faked, that he had left the island and that he made his way back to England. Many scholars believe that the rumours of Christian returning to England helped to inspire Samuel Taylor Coleridge's The Rime of the Ancient Mariner.

There is no portrait or drawing extant of Fletcher Christian that was drawn from life. Bligh described Christian as "5 ft. 9 in. high [175 cm]. blackish or very dark complexion. Hair – Blackish or very dark brown. Make – Strong. A star tatowed  on his left breast, and tatowed  on the backside. His knees stand a little out and he may be called a little bow legged. He is subject to violent perspiration, particularly in his hand, so that he soils anything he handles".

Portrayals in the arts

Appearances in literature
Christian's principal literary appearances are in the treatments of Bounty story, including Mutiny on the Bounty (1932), Pitcairn's Island (1934) and After the Bounty (an edited version of James Morrison's journal, 2009). He also appears in R. M. Ballantyne's The Lonely Island; or, The Refuge of the Mutineers (1880) and in Charles Dickens' The Long Voyage (1853).

In Peter F. Hamilton's Night's Dawn trilogy, Fletcher Christian's ghost appears, possessing a human body, and helps two non-possessed girls escape. William Kinsolving's 1996 novel Mister Christian and Val McDermid's 2006 thriller The Grave Tattoo are both based on Christian's rumoured return to the Lake District and the fact that he was at school with William Wordsworth. Dan L. Thrapp's 2002 novel Mutiny's Curse  is based on a similar premise. In 1959 Louis MacNeice produced a BBC Radio play called I Call Me Adam, written by Laurie Lee, about the mutineers' lives on Pitcairn.

Film portrayals

Christian was portrayed in films by:
 Wilton Powers in The Mutiny of the Bounty (1916)
 Errol Flynn in In the Wake of the Bounty (1933)
 Clark Gable in Mutiny on the Bounty (1935)
 Marlon Brando in Mutiny on the Bounty (1962)
 Mel Gibson in The Bounty (1984)

The 1935 and 1962 films are based on the 1932 novel Mutiny on the Bounty in which Christian is a major character and is generally portrayed positively. The authors of that novel, Charles Nordhoff and James Norman Hall, also wrote two sequels, one of which, Pitcairn's Island, is the story of the tragic events after the mutiny that apparently resulted in Christian's death along with other violent deaths on Pitcairn Island. (The other sequel, Men Against the Sea, is the story of Bligh's voyage after the mutiny.) This series of novels uses fictionalised versions of minor crew members as narrators of the stories.

The Bounty, released in 1984, is less sympathetic to Christian than previous treatments were.

Musical portrayal
 David Essex in Mutiny! (1985)
 Mekons "(Sometimes I Feel Like) Fletcher Christian" from So Good It Hurts (Sin Record Company/Cooking Vinyl, Rough Trade Records Germany) (1988)
 Rasputina "Cage in a Cave" from Oh Perilous World (Filthy Bonnet) (2007)
 The Rolling Stones “(Dancing in the Light)”
 Four Jacks “(The Story of Bounty)”

See also

 Garth Christian – a relative
 Descendants of the Bounty mutineers – Thomas Colman Christian, who died 7 July 2013.

References
Notes

Bibliography
 
 
 
 

Further reading
 
 Christian, Harrison (2021). Men Without Country: The true story of exploration and rebellion in the South Seas. Ultimo Press. 2021. .
 Conway, Christiane (2005). Letters from the Isle of Man – The Bounty – Correspondence of Nessy and Peter Heywood. The Manx Experience. .

External links
General information
 History of Pitcairn Island
 Moorland Close

Genealogical information
The following genealogical information about Fletcher Christian and the other Bounty crew members comes from descendants of the Bounty crew, who may not be reliable and from historical archives.
 HMS Bounty Ancestors and Cousins
 George Snell's HMS Bounty Descendants Page
 Norfolk Island Research and Genealogy Centre

Related information
 Fletcher Christian's biography, PISC Crew Encyclopedia
 Pitcairn Islands Study Centre (PISC)

English people murdered abroad
English murder victims
History of Norfolk Island
18th-century pirates
HMS Bounty mutineers
People from Cockermouth
People murdered in the Pitcairn Islands
Pitcairn Islands people of Manx descent
Royal Navy officers
1764 births
1793 deaths
People from Dearham
English emigrants to the Pitcairn Islands
English people of Manx descent
Castaways
Pitcairn Islands people
18th-century Manx people